The following telephone numbers in Armenia are destination codes for international calls terminating in Armenia as well as the procedures for dialing internationally from within Armenia.

Dialling plan
The dialling plan is as below:

Calling Armenia from abroad
From abroad to Yerevan, regions, mobile network, Artsakh fixed telephone network and Artsakh mobile network:
   + 374 + Destination Code + Subscriber Number           (to Yerevan, regions)
   + 374 + Mobile Network Code + Mobile Subscriber Number (to mobile network)
   + 374 + 47 + Subscriber Number                         (to Artsakh fixed telephone network)
   + 374 + 97 + Subscriber Number                         (to Artsakh mobile network)

Calling from Armenia
From Yerevan, regions, mobile network and Artsakh to abroad:
   00 + Country Code + Destination Code + Subscriber Number
Calls to North America from anywhere in Armenia receive a substantial discount if preceded by a special code specific to each Armenian phone company.

For example, if one makes a call from a Vivacell-MTS phone to North America and dials 77 first, one is charged 14 AMD per minute. It is the same deal for callers from a Beeline (whether a mobile or landline) if a call is preceded by *88*.

Thus, from a Vivacell phone one must dial; 77 + 00 + Country Code (1 for North America) + Destination Code + Subscriber Number
And from a beeline phone (landline or cell) one must dial: *88* + 00 + Country Code (1 for North America) + Destination Code + Subscriber Number

Calling within Armenia and Artsakh
   0 + Destination Code + Subscriber Number

Calling Artsakh from Armenia
From Yerevan, regions and mobile network to Artsakh fixed telephone network and Artsakh mobile network:
   0 + 47 + Subscriber Number                      (to Artsakh fixed telephone network)
   0 + 97 + Subscriber Number                      (to Artsakh mobile network)

Example
An example for calling telephones in Yerevan, Armenia is as follows:
                Subscriber Number  (within Yerevan)
       0 + 10 + Subscriber Number  (within Armenia and Artsakh)
   + 374 + 10 + Subscriber Number  (outside Armenia and Artsakh)

Destination codes

All

By regions

Aragatsotn
Aparan: 252
Ashtarak: 232
Talin: 249 0
Tsaghkahovit: 257 0

Ararat
Ararat: 238
Artashat: 235
Masis: 236
Vedi: 234

Armavir
Armavir: 237
Baghramyan: 233
Dalarik: 233 76
Vagharshapat: 231
Sardarapat: 237
Metsamor: 237
Myasnikyan: 233 74
Karakert: 233 75
Zvartnots: 231
Baghramian: 231 90
Vache: 231 91
Norakert: 231 95
Jrarat: 231 98
Khoronk: 231 99

Gegharkunik
Chambarak: 265
Gavar: 264
Martuni: 262
Sarukhan: 264
Sevan: 261
Vardenis: 269
Khachik: 281 51
Arpi: 281 91
Aghavnadzor: 281 93
Areni: 281 94
Malishka: 281 95
Yelpin: 281 97
Rind: 281 98
Shatin: 281 99

Kotayk
Abovyan: 222
Ptghni: 222 96
Hrazdan: 223
Meghradzor: 223 93
Pyunik: 223 94
Alapars: 226 75
Solak: 223 97
Bjni: 223 98
Tsaghkadzor: 223
Charentsavan: 226
Eghvard: 224
Nor Hachn: 224
Nor Geghi: 224
Zovuni: 224 52
Proshyan: 224 53
Argel: 224 54
Mayakovski: 222 90
Balahovit: 222 91
Kamaris: 222 91
Aramus: 222 93
Arzni: 222 94
Geghashen: 222 97
Kotayk: 222 99
Lernanist: 223 91
Arzakan: 226 72

Lori
Alaverdi: 253
Margahovit: 322 6
Spitak: 255
Stepanavan: 256
Tashir: 254
Vanadzor: 322
Pambak: 322 93
Lernapat: 322 94
Yeghegnut: 322 95
Dzoraget: 322 97
Lermontovo: 322 98
Vahagni: 322 99

Shirak
Akhuryan: 243 00
Amasia: 246
Ani Kayaran: 242 97
Arapi: 243 00
Artik: 244
Ashotsk: 245
Gyumri: 312
Kamo: 243 00
Maralik: 242
Pemzashen: 244
Sarnakhbyur: 242 91
Shirakavan: 242 93
Artik: 244
Panik: 244 92
Arevshat: 244 95
Mets Mantash: 244 96

Syunik
Goris: 284
Kajaran: 285
Kapan: 285
Khndzoresk: 284 94
Meghri: 286 0
Sisian: 283 0
Verishen: 284
Agarak: 286

Artsakh
Stepanakert: 471
Martakert: 474
Hadrut: 475
Askeran: 476
Shushi: 477
Kashatagh: 477 32
Martuni: 478

Tavush
Berd: 267
Dilijan: 268 0
Ijevan: 263
Koghb: 266
Noyemberian: 266

Vayots Dzor
Eghegnadzor: 281
Jermuk: 287
Vayk: 282

Yerevan
Yerevan: 10, 11, 12, 15

Non-geographic network codes
Several new blocks of numbers have been assigned in 2010 and 2011 to several Armenian ITSPs for their respective non-geographic networks.

Mobile network codes

On 1 April 2014, mobile number portability was launched in Armenia, which means that subscribers of mobile operators can have any mobile network code by porting in from the host operator.

Emergency numbers

References

External links
RA regions’ codes
ITU-T:International Numbering Resources:National Numbering Plans:Armenia
 ITU communication of 2021.06.03: The Ministry of High-Tech Industry, Yerevan, announces the updated version of National Numbering Plan of Armenia For Yerevan.  For Yerevan 012, 015 codes were added. 

Armenia
Telecommunications in Armenia
Newspapers